Treboš is a village in the municipality of Želino, North Macedonia.

Demographics
According to the 2002 census, the village had a total of 2388 inhabitants. Ethnic groups in the village include:

Albanians 2372

References

External links

Villages in Želino Municipality
Albanian communities in North Macedonia